Filippo Lippi  ( – 8 October 1469), also known as Lippo Lippi, was an Italian painter of the Quattrocento (15th century) and a Carmelite Priest.

Biography
Lippi was born in Florence in 1406 to Tommaso, a butcher, and his wife. He was orphaned when he was two years old and sent to live with his aunt Mona Lapaccia. Because she was too poor to rear him, she placed him in the neighboring Carmelite convent when he was eight years old. There, he started his education. In 1420 he was admitted to the community of Carmelite friars of the Priory of Our Lady of Mount Carmel in Florence, taking religious vows in the Order the following year, at the age of sixteen. He was ordained as a priest in approximately 1425 and remained in residence of that priory until 1432. Giorgio Vasari, the first art historian of the Renaissance, writes that Lippi was inspired to become a painter by watching Masaccio at work in the Carmine church. Lippi's early work, notably the Tarquinia Madonna (Galleria Nazionale, Rome) shows that influence from Masaccio. In his Lives of the Artists, Vasari says about Lippi: "Instead of studying, he spent all his time scrawling pictures on his own books and those of others." Due to Lippi's interest, the prior decided to give him the opportunity to learn painting.

In 1432 Filippo Lippi quit the monastery, although he was not released from his vows. In a letter dated 1439 he describes himself as the poorest friar of Florence, charged with the maintenance of six marriageable nieces.

According to Vasari, Lippi then went on to visit Ancona and Naples, where he was captured by Barbary pirates and kept as a slave. His skill in portrait-sketching helped to eventually release him. Louis Gillet, writing for the Catholic Encyclopedia, considers this account "assuredly nothing but a romance".

With Lippi's return to Florence in 1432, his paintings had become popular, warranting the support of the Medici family, who commissioned The Annunciation and the Seven Saints. Cosimo de' Medici had to lock him up in order to compel him to work, and even then the painter escaped by a rope made of his sheets. His escapades threw him into financial difficulties from which he did not hesitate to extricate himself by forgery. His life included many similar tales of lawsuits, complaints, broken promises, and scandal.

In 1441 Lippi painted an altarpiece for the nuns of S. Ambrogio which is now a prominent attraction in the Academy of Florence, and was celebrated in Browning's well-known poem Fra Lippo Lippi. It represents the coronation of the Virgin among angels and saints, including many Bernardine monks. One of these, placed to the right, is a half-length figure originally thought to be a self-portrait of Lippi, pointed out by the inscription is perfecit opus upon an angel's scroll; it was later believed instead to be a portrait of the benefactor who commissioned the painting.

In 1452 Lippi was appointed chaplain to the nuns at the Monastery of St. Mary Magdalene in Florence. 
In June 1456 Fra Filippo is recorded as living in Prato (near Florence) to paint frescoes in the choir of the cathedral. In 1458, while engaged in this work, he set about painting a picture for the monastery chapel of S. Margherita in that city, where he met Lucrezia Buti, a beautiful novice of the Order and the daughter of a Florentine named Francesco Buti. Lippi asked that she might be permitted to sit for the figure of the Madonna (or perhaps S. Margherita).  Lippi engaged in sexual relations with her, abducted her to his own house, and kept her there despite the nuns' efforts to reclaim her. This relationship resulted in their son, Filippino Lippi, who became a famous painter following his father.

In 1457 he was appointed commendatory Rector (Rettore commendatario) of S. Quirico in Legania, from which institutions he occasionally made considerable profits. Despite these profits, Lippi struggled to escape poverty throughout his life.

The close of Lippi's life was spent at Spoleto, where he had been commissioned to paint scenes from the life of the Virgin for the apse of the cathedral. In the semidome of the apse is the Christ Crowning the Madonna, with angels, sibyls, and prophets. This series, which is not wholly equal to the one at Prato, was completed by one of his assistants, his fellow Carmelite, Fra Diamante, after Lippi's death. Lippi died in Spoleto, on or about 8 October 1469. The mode of his death is a matter of dispute. It has been said that the pope granted Lippi a dispensation for marrying Lucrezia, but before the permission arrived, Lippi had been poisoned by the indignant relatives of either Lucrezia herself or some lady who had replaced her in the inconstant painter's affections.

Works 
The frescoes in the choir of the cathedral of Prato, which depict the stories of St. John the Baptist and St. Stephen on the two main facing walls, are considered Fra Filippo's most important and monumental works, particularly the figure of Salome dancing, which has clear affinities with later works by Sandro Botticelli, his pupil, and Filippino Lippi, his son, as well as the scene showing the ceremonial mourning over Stephen's corpse. This latter is believed to contain a portrait of the painter, but there are various opinions as to which is the exact figure. On the end wall of the choir are S. Giovanni Gualberto and S. Alberto, while the vault has monumental representations of the four evangelists.

For Germiniano Inghirami of Prato he painted the Death of St. Bernard. His principal altarpiece in this city is a Nativity in the refectory of S. Domenico – the Infant on the ground adored by the Virgin and Joseph, between Saints George and Dominic, in a rocky landscape, with the shepherds playing and six angels in the sky. In the Uffizi is a fine Virgin, also called "Lippina", adoring the infant Christ, who is held by two angels; in the National Gallery, London, a Vision of St Bernard. The picture of the Virgin and Infant with an Angel, in this same gallery, also ascribed to Lippi, is disputable.

Filippo Lippi died in 1469 while working on the frescoes of Scenes of the Life of the Virgin Mary, 1467–1469 in the apse of the Spoleto Cathedral. The Frescos show the Annunciation, the Funeral, the Adoration of the Child and the Coronation of the Virgin. A group of bystanders depicted at the funeral includes a self-portrait of Lippi, together with his son Filippino and his helpers, Fra Diamante and Pier Matteo d'Amelia. Lippi was buried on the right side of the transept, with a monument commissioned by Lorenzo de' Medici. Francesco di Pesello (called Pesellino) and Sandro Botticelli were among his most distinguished pupils.

Selected works
Enthroned Madonna and Child (Madonna of Tarquinia) (1437) -Tempera on panel, 151 x 66 cm, Galleria Nazionale d'Arte Antica, Rome
Pietà (1437–1439) -Tempera on panel, 86 x 107 cm, Museo Poldi Pezzoli, Milan
Madonna and Child with Saints (1438) - Panel, 208 x 244 cm, Louvre, Paris
St. Jerome in Penance (c. 1439) - Tempera on panel, 54 x 37 cm, Lindenau Museum, Altenburg
The Annunciation with two Kneeling Donors (c. 1440) - Oil on panel, 155 x 144 cm, Galleria Nazionale d'Arte Antica, Rome
Martelli Annunciation (c. 1440) - Tempera on panel, 175 x 183 cm, San Lorenzo, Florence
Novitiate Altarpiece (c.1440-1445) - Tempera on panel, 196 x 196 cm, Uffizi, Florence
Coronation of the Virgin (1441–1447) - Tempera on panel, 200 x 287 cm, Uffizi, Florence
Annunciation (c. 1443–1450) - Wood, 203 x 185.3 cm, Alte Pinakothek, Munich
Marsuppini Coronation (after 1444) - Tempera on panel, 172 x 251 cm, Pinacoteca Vaticana, Rome
Annunciation (1445–50) - Oil on panel, 117 x 173 cm, Galleria Doria Pamphilj, Rome
Annunciation (c. 1449–1459) - Tempera on panel, 68 x 151.5 cm, National Gallery, London
Seven Saints (c. 1449–1459) - Tempera on panel, 68 x 151.5 cm, National Gallery, London
Madonna and Child (c. 1452) - Panel, diameter 135 cm, Pitti Gallery, Florence
Funeral of St. Jerome (c. 1452–1460) - Tempera on panel, 268 x 165 cm, Museo dell'Opera del Duomo, Prato Cathedral
Stories of St. Stephen and St. John the Baptist (1452–1465) - Fresco cycle, Cathedral of Prato 
Madonna del Ceppo (c. 1452–1453) - Panel, 187 x 120 cm, Civic Museum, Prato
Madonna and Child (c. 1455) - Panel, Uffizi, Florence
Adoration in the Forest (late 1450s) - Panel, 127 x 116 cm, Staatliche Museen, Berlin
Madonna of Palazzo Medici-Riccardi (1466–1469) - Tempera on panel, 115 x 71 cm, Palazzo Medici-Riccardi, Florence 
Scenes from the Life of the Virgin Mary (1467–1469) - Fresco, apse of the Spoleto Cathedral 
Madonna and Child (between circa 1446 and circa 1447), The Walters Art Museum.
Triptych of the Madonna of Humility with saints

Gallery

References

Further reading
 Ruda, Jeffrey (1993). Fra Filippo Lippi: Life and Work. London: Phaidon Press. .

Historical novels
 Proud, Linda (2012). A Gift for the Magus. Godstow Press. . [A literary novel about Filippo Lippi and Cosimo de' Medici.]

External links

www.FraFilippoLippi.org 75 works by Filippo Lippi
Paul George Konody, Filippo Lippi, London: T.C. & E.C. Jack; New York: Frederick A. Stokes, 1911.
Italian Paintings: Florentine School, a collection catalog containing information about Lippi and his works (see pages: 92–94).
Fra Filippo Lippi at the National Gallery of Art

Italian Renaissance painters
Painters from Florence
Quattrocento painters
1406 births
1469 deaths
Italian male painters
Carmelites
15th-century Italian Roman Catholic priests
Catholic painters
Burials at Spoleto Cathedral
15th-century people of the Republic of Florence
15th-century Italian painters